Secret Societies is a 1995 role-playing game supplement for Nephilim published by Chaosium.

Contents
Secret Societies concentrates on the secret societies which oppose the Nephilim in their quest for spiritual transcendence.

Reception
Andrew Rilstone reviewed Secret Societies for Arcane magazine, rating it a 5 out of 10 overall. Rilstone comments that "I get the feeling that this book is aimed at people who are interested in the world of Nephilim for its own sake, irrespective of whether they are actually going to play it. if you're one of them, then you'll probably find it indispensable."

Reviews
Pyramid V1,  #18 (March/April, 1996)
The Unspeakable Oath #14/15 (1997)

References

Role-playing game books
Role-playing game supplements introduced in 1995